Prunus webbii is a species Prunus found growing around the northeastern Mediterranean Sea, from Sicily, through Greece, Crete and the Aegean Islands, the Balkans and Anatolia, and possibly as far as Iraq or Iran. A dense spiny shrub or small tree with extremely bitter seeds, it is thought to have contributed some genes to the domesticated almond Prunus dulcis, although the extent of the contribution is debated and not yet fully understood.

References

webbii
Flora of Southeastern Europe
Flora of Western Asia